Patricia Ryan may refer to:

 Pat Nixon (1912–1993), née Patricia Ryan, wife of U.S. president Richard Nixon
 Patricia Ryan (CFF), former director of the Cult Awareness Network, daughter of former U.S. Congressman Leo Ryan
 Patricia Ryan (author) (born 1954), American writer
 Patricia Ryan (actress) (1921–1949), active in old-time radio from childhood until her death at age 27
 Patricia Ryan (equestrian) (born 1973), Irish equestrian
 Patricia E. Ryan, American human rights advocate and women's rights lobbyist
 Patricia Ryan (judge), Irish judge
 Patricia Ryan (politician), Irish Sinn Féin politician for Kildare South

See also
 Patty Ryan (born 1961), German singer
Pat Ryan (disambiguation)